Jahan Kosha Cannon (also known as the Great Gun, and literally means the Destroyer of the World) is placed in the Topekhana, 400 m to the south east of the Katra Mosque, in the town of Murshidabad, West Bengal, India. Topekhana was the Nawab's Artillery Park and the entrance gate of the old capital of Bengal, Bihar and Orissa, the city of Jahangir Nagar. It is protected on the east by the Gobra Nala, locally known as the Katra Jheel. Here, the Jahan Kosha Cannon is laid to rest. Before being placed at its current location, it rested on a carriage with wheels and was surrounded by the roots of a Peepal tree. The growth of the tree roots gradually lifted the gun four feet above the ground. The wheels of the gun carriage have disappeared, but the iron-work of the carriage and the trunions are still visible. The cannon is made of ashtadhatu or 8 metals, namely silver, gold, lead, copper, zinc, tin, iron and mercury.

The cannon is more than 7 tons in weight. It is 17 feet and 6 inches in length and 3 feet in width. It has a girth of 5 feet at the touch hole end. The circumference of its mouth is more than one foot. The radius of the touch hole is one and a half inches. In order to fire this cannon once, 17 kilograms of gunpowder was needed. The bore is approximately 6 inches.

The cannon was made in 1637 by Janardan Karmakar, a blacksmith and gunsmith, under the instructions of Daroga Shere Mohammad and under the supervision of Hara Ballav Das. The cannon was made in Dacca, when Shah Jahan was the Mughal emperor, at the instance of Islam Khan, who was the Subedar of Bengal. This is confirmed by an inscription engraved on it. However, the cannon has several other names like the "Great Gun", the "Destroyer of the world", the "Conqueror of the universe", the "World Subduer" and so on.

The cannon is maintained by the Archaeological Survey of India.

References

External links

 

Tourist attractions in Murshidabad
Large-calibre artillery
Artillery of India
Individual cannons
History of Dhaka
1637 establishments in Asia